The Sydney Morning Herald (SMH) is a daily compact newspaper published in Sydney, New South Wales, Australia, and owned by Nine. Founded in 1831 as the Sydney Herald, the Herald is the oldest continuously published newspaper in Australia and claims to be the most widely-read masthead in the country. The newspaper is published in compact print form from Monday to Saturday as The Sydney Morning Herald and on Sunday as its sister newspaper, The Sun-Herald and digitally as an online site and app, seven days a week. It is considered a newspaper of record for Australia. The print edition of The Sydney Morning Herald is available for purchase from many retail outlets throughout the Sydney metropolitan area, most parts of regional New South Wales, the Australian Capital Territory and South East Queensland.

Overview
The Sydney Morning Herald publishes a variety of supplements, including the magazines Good Weekend (included in the Saturday edition of The Sydney Morning Herald); and Sunday Life. There are a variety of lift-outs, some of them co-branded with online classified-advertising sites:
 The Guide (television) on Mondays
 Good Food (food) and Domain (real estate) on Tuesdays
 Money (personal finance) on Wednesdays
 Drive (motoring), Shortlist (entertainment) on Fridays
 News Review, Spectrum (arts and entertainment guide), Domain (real estate), Drive (motoring) and MyCareer (employment) on Saturdays

The executive editor is James Chessell and the editor is Bevan Shields. Tory Maguire is national editor, Monique Farmer is life editor, and the publisher is chief digital and publishing officer Chris Janz.

Former editors include Darren Goodsir, Judith Whelan, Sean Aylmer, Peter Fray, Meryl Constance, Amanda Wilson (the first female editor, appointed in 2011), William Curnow, Andrew Garran, Frederick William Ward (editor from 1884 to 1890), Charles Brunsdon Fletcher, Colin Bingham, Max Prisk, John Alexander, Paul McGeough, Alan Revell, Alan Oakley, and Lisa Davies.

History

The Sydney Herald was founded in 1831 by three employees of the now-defunct Sydney Gazette: Ward Stephens, Frederick Stokes, and William McGarvie. A Centenary Supplement (since digitised) was published in 1931. The original four-page weekly had a print run of 750. The newspaper began to publish daily in 1840, and the operation was purchased in 1841 by an Englishman named John Fairfax who renamed it The Sydney Morning Herald the following year. Fairfax, whose family were to control the newspaper for almost 150 years, based his editorial policies "upon principles of candour, honesty and honour. We have no wish to mislead; no interest to gratify by unsparing abuse or indiscriminate approbation."

Donald Murray, who invented a predecessor of the teleprinter, worked at the Herald during the 1890s. A weekly "Page for Women" was added in 1905, edited by Theodosia Ada Wallace.

The SMH was late to the trend of printing news rather than just advertising on the front page, doing so from 15 April 1944. Of the country's metropolitan dailies, only The West Australian was later in making the switch. The newspaper launched a Sunday edition, The Sunday Herald, in 1949. Four years later, this was merged with the newly acquired Sun newspaper to create The Sun-Herald, which continues to this day.

By the mid-1960s, a new competitor had appeared in Rupert Murdoch's national daily The Australian, which was first published on 15 July 1964.

John Fairfax & Sons Limited commemorated the Herald's 150th anniversary in 1981 by presenting the City of Sydney with Stephen Walker's sculpture, Tank Stream Fountain.

In 1995, the company launched the newspaper's web edition smh.com.au. The site has since grown to include interactive and multimedia features beyond the content in the print edition. Around the same time, the organisation moved from Jones Street to new offices at Darling Park and built a new printing press at Chullora, in the city's west. The SMH later moved with other Sydney Fairfax divisions to a building at Darling Island.

In May 2007, Fairfax Media announced it would be moving from a broadsheet format to the smaller compact or tabloid-size, in the footsteps of The Times, for both The Sydney Morning Herald and The Age. After abandoning these plans later in the year, Fairfax Media again announced in June 2012 its plan to shift both broadsheet newspapers to tabloid size, with effect from March 2013. Fairfax also announced it would cut staff across the entire group by 1,900 over three years and erect paywalls around the papers' websites. The subscription type was to be a freemium model, limiting readers to a number of free stories per month, with a payment required for further access. The announcement was part of an overall "digital first" strategy of increasingly digital or on-line content over printed delivery, to "increase sharing of editorial content," and to assist the management's wish for "full integration of its online, print and mobile platforms."

It was announced in July 2013 that the SMH news director, Darren Goodsir, would become editor-in-chief, replacing Sean Aylmer.

On 22 February 2014, the Saturday edition was produced in broadsheet format for the final time, with this too converted to compact format on 1 March 2014, ahead of the decommissioning of the printing plant at Chullora in June 2014.

In June 2022, the paper received global coverage and backlash to an attempted outing of Australian actress Rebel Wilson by columnist Andrew Hornery, and the subsequent defense of his since-deleted column by editor Bevan Shields; Wilson preempted the Hornery disclosure with an Instagram post confirming her relationship.

Editorial stance
The newspaper's editorial stance is  generally centrist. According to one commentator it is seen as the most centrist among the three major Australian non-tabloids (the other two being The Australian and The Age). In 2004, the newspaper's editorial page stated: "market libertarianism and social liberalism" were the two "broad themes" that guided the Heralds editorial stance. During the 1999 referendum on whether Australia should become a republic, the Herald (like the other two major papers) strongly supported a "yes" vote.

The Sydney Morning Herald did not endorse the Labor Party for federal office in the first six decades of Federation, always endorsing a conservative government. The newspaper endorsed Labor in only seven federal elections: 1961 (Calwell), 1984 and 1987 (Hawke), 2007 (Rudd),  2010 (Gillard),, 2019 (Shorten), and 2022 (Albanese).

During the 2004 Australian federal election, the Herald did not endorse a party, but subsequently resumed its practice of making endorsements. After endorsing the Coalition at the 2013 and 2016 federal elections, the newspaper begrudgingly endorsed Bill Shorten's Labor Party in 2019, after Malcolm Turnbull was ousted as prime minister.

At the state level, the Herald has consistently backed the Coalition; the only time since 1981 that it has endorsed a Labor government for New South Wales was Bob Carr's government in the 2003 election. 
 
The Herald endorsed Democratic candidate Hillary Clinton in the run-up for the 2016 U.S. presidential election.

Notable contributors

Writers

 Waleed Aly
 Eliza Ashton
 Louisa Atkinson
 Julia Baird
 Lucian Boz
 Mike Carlton
 Anne Davies
 Peter FitzSimons
 Ross Gittins
 Richard Glover
 Peter Hartcher
 Amanda Hooton
 Adele Horin
 H. G. Kippax
 Amy Mack
 Louise Mack
 Roy Masters
 Anne Summers
 Kate McClymont

Illustrators
 Simon Letch, named as one of the year's best illustrators on four consecutive occasions.

Ownership

Fairfax went public in 1957 and grew to acquire interests in magazines, radio, and television. The group collapsed spectacularly on 11 December 1990 when Warwick Fairfax, great-great-grandson of John Fairfax, attempted to privatize the group by borrowing $1.8 billion. The group was bought by Conrad Black before being re-listed in 1992. In 2006, Fairfax announced a merger with Rural Press, which brought in a Fairfax family member, John B. Fairfax, as a significant player in the company. From 10 December 2018 Nine and Fairfax Media merged into one business known as Nine. Nine Entertainment Co. owns The Sydney Morning Herald.

Content

Column 8
Column 8 is a short column to which Herald readers send their observations of interesting happenings. It was first published on 11 January 1947. The name comes from the fact that it originally occupied the final (8th) column of the broadsheet newspaper's front page. In a front-page redesign in the lead-up to the Sydney Olympic Games in 2000, Column 8 moved to the back page of the first section from 31 July 2000.

The content tends to the quirky, typically involving strange urban occurrences, instances of confusing signs (often in Engrish), word play, and discussion of more or less esoteric topics.

The column is also sometimes affectionately known as Granny's Column, after a fictional grandmother who supposedly edited it. The column's original logo was a caricature of Sydney Deamer, originator of the column and its author for 14 years.

It was edited for 15 years by George Richards, who retired on 31 January 2004. Other editors besides Deamer and Richards have been Duncan Thompson, Bill Fitter, Col Allison, Jim Cunningham, Pat Sheil, and briefly, Peter Bowers and Lenore Nicklin. The column is, as of March 2017, edited by Herald journalist Tim Barlass, who frequently appends reader contributions with puns; and who made the decision to reduce the column's publication from its traditional six days a week, down to just weekdays.

Opinion
The Opinion section is a regular of the daily newspaper, containing opinion on a wide range of issues. Mostly concerned with relevant political, legal and cultural issues, the section presents work by regular columnists, including Herald political editor Peter Hartcher, Ross Gittins, as well as occasional reader-submitted content. Iconoclastic Sydney barrister Charles C. Waterstreet, upon whose life the television workplace comedy Rake is loosely based, had a regular humour column in this section.

Good Weekend 
Good Weekend is a liftout magazine that is distributed with both The Sydney Morning Herald and The Age in Saturday editions.

It contains, on average, four feature articles written by its stable of writers and others syndicated from overseas as well as sections on food, wine and fashion.

Writers include Stephanie Wood, Jane Cadzow, Melissa Fyfe, Tim Elliott, Konrad Marshall and Amanda Hooton.

Other sections include "Modern Guru," which features humorous columnists including Danny Katz responding to the everyday dilemmas of readers; a regular column by writer Benjamin Law; a Samurai Sudoku; and "The Two of Us," containing interviews with a pair of close friends, relatives or colleagues.

"Good Weekend" is edited by Katrina Strickland. Previous editors include Ben Naparstek, Judith Whelan and Fenella Souter.

Digitisation
The paper has been partially digitised as part of the Australian Newspapers Digitisation Program project of the National Library of Australia.

See also
 Journalism in Australia
 List of newspapers in Australia
 The Sydney Mail – weekly magazine of The Sydney Morning Herald, published from 1860 to 1938

References

Further reading
 Merrill, John C. and Harold A. Fisher. The world's great dailies: profiles of fifty newspapers (1980) pp 314–19
 Gavin Souter (1981) Company of Heralds: a century and a half of Australian publishing by John Fairfax Limited and its predecessors, 1831-1981 Carlton, Victoria: Melbourne University Press, 
 Gavin Souter (1992) Heralds and angels: the house of Fairfax 1841-1992 Ringwood, Victoria: Penguin Books,

External links

 
 Earth Hour archive
 
 
 

1831 establishments in Australia
Australian news websites
 Fairfax Media
Fairfax Media
Newspapers published in Sydney
Publications established in 1831
Daily newspapers published in Australia
Newspapers on Trove
Nine Entertainment